The Institute of Counter Fraud Specialists (ICFS) is an institute who's mission is to further the cause of fraud prevention and detection across all sectors of the UK and abroad. It was founded as a result of the United Kingdom Government's initiative to professionalise public sector fraud investigation.

Accomplishments
In collaboration with the National Health Service, Local Authorities and other public and private sector bodies, the institute has aimed to raise the standards of professional fraud investigation in the UK. 

The ICFS has also worked with the University of Portsmouth and its Institute of Criminal Justice Studies to develop academic courses specialising in counter fraud, corruption and criminal justice studies.

Membership
The membership of the ICFS is made up of Accredited Counter Fraud Specialists who have successfully completed the government's 'Professionalism in Security' (PinS) training.

References

External links
ICFS

Fraud in the United Kingdom
Crime prevention
Law enforcement in the United Kingdom